Góral is a Polish habitational surname. Notable people with the name include:
 Boleslaus Goral (1876–1960), Polish-American priest, professor, and newspaper editor
 Dariusz Góral (1991), Polish former professional footballer who played as a striker

References 

Polish-language surnames
Polish toponymic surnames